A fact is an occurrence in the real world.

Fact or Facts may also refer to:

Basic uses
 Fact (law), a statement which is found to be true after hearing evidence
 Fact (data warehouse), a value or measurement, which represents a fact about the managed entity or system
 Fact, a verifiable and objective observation in science 
 Fact, a true proposition or something that makes a proposition true in philosophy; see truthmaker

Literature
 Fact (UK magazine), an online music magazine
 Fact (US magazine), a former American publication that commented on controversial topics
 Fact, a left-wing British magazine edited by Raymond Postgate
 "Facts", a poem by Lewis Carroll

Music
 Fact (band), a Japanese post-hardcore band
 Fact (album), the self-titled album of Japanese post-hardcore band Fact
 "Facts" (song), a 2015 song by Kanye West
 "Facts", a song by H.E.R. from the album H.E.R.
 "Facts", a song by Lecrae from the album All Things Work Together

See also
 FACT (disambiguation) (including FACTS)